Ian Mitchell (9 May 1946 – 2 April 1996) was a Scottish footballer who played mainly for Dundee United and holds the record of being the youngest player ever to make a first team appearance for the club.

Mitchell was born in Falkirk. After winning schoolboy caps for Scotland, Dundee United snapped him up as a juvenile. He became a regular in the first team after a good showing in his debut, aged only sixteen. He is one of five United players to score more than 100 league goals for the club and in the top twenty appearances for the club.

In 1970, he signed for Newcastle United for £50,000 but returned to Dundee United a year later. He also had spells with Falkirk and Brechin City before retiring.

He died after a long illness at the age of 49.

References

External links
 Arab Archive profile
 

1946 births
1996 deaths
Footballers from Falkirk
Scottish footballers
Dundee United F.C. players
Newcastle United F.C. players
Falkirk F.C. players
Brechin City F.C. players
Scottish Football League players
English Football League players
Association football wingers
Scotland under-23 international footballers